Emile Saimovici (born 10 April 1993) is an footballer. Born in Singapore, he plays for the Barbados national team. Besides Barbados, he has played in Canada and the United States.

Early life
A native of Vancouver, Canada, Saimovici is the son of a Romanian-Canadian father and a Barbadian mother. He earned a scholarship to play for the Oregon State University Beavers, but due to some logistical issues, he instead went to their feeder school Clark College. He later attended Centennial College in Toronto, where he was named an OCAA league all-star in 2013–14.

Club career
In 2014, he played with Durham United FC in League1 Ontario.

He later played at the amateur level with Vancouver Metro Soccer League club Vancouver Croatia SC, where he captained them to their first VMSL title in 30 years.

International career
In March 2021, he was named to the Barbados national team for the first time for 2022 FIFA World Cup qualifying matches. He debuted internationally on 25 March 2021, in a match against Panama in a 1–0 loss. On 30 March 2021, Saimovici scored his first goal for Barbados against Anguilla in a 1–0 victory in his second international game.

International goals
Scores and results list Barbados's goal tally first.

Honours

Club
Croatia SC
 Vancouver Metro Soccer League: 2018–19

References

External links
 
 
 Clark Penguins bio

1993 births
Living people
People with acquired Barbadian citizenship
Barbadian footballers
Barbados international footballers
Association football midfielders
Barbadian people of Canadian descent
Barbadian people of Romanian descent
Canadian people of Barbadian descent
Sportspeople of Barbadian descent
Canadian people of Romanian descent
Canadian soccer players
Centennial College alumni
Clark College alumni
College men's soccer players in the United States
University and college soccer players in Canada
Pickering FC players